Cosmographia (Latin, from Greek κόσμος, "world, universe", and γραφή, "representation") may refer to:

Written works
Cosmographia, an alternative name for Ptolemy's Geographia
Cosmographia, a late antique or early medieval geographical work by Julius Honorius
Cosmographia, an early medieval geographical work feigned to record the travels of one Aethicus Ister
Ravenna Cosmography, a seventh- or eighth-century work by an anonymous of Ravenna
Cosmographia (Bernardus Silvestris), a twelfth-century allegory by Bernardus Silvestris
Cosmographia, a fifteenth-century work by the German geographer Nicolaus Germanus
Cosmographia, an alternative title of Petrus Apianus' sixteenth-century Cosmographicus liber
Cosmographia (Sebastian Münster), a sixteenth-century work by the German geographer Sebastian Münster
Cosmographia, a sixteenth-century work by the Portuguese geographer Bartolomeu Velho
Cosmographia, a sixteenth-century treatise by the Italian Francesco Maurolico
Cosmographia Blaviana, an alternative name for Joan Blaeu's Atlas Maior

Maps
Universalis Cosmographia, a sixteenth-century map by Martin Waldseemüller, the first to feature the name "America"

See also
Cosmography
Cosmographiae Introductio, a 1507 geographical work by Martin Waldseemüller